Khalid Abad is a village in Dera Ghazi Khan District, Punjab Province, Pakistan. The village has a mosque and school. Its population is about 2,000. Literacy is about 70%.
     

Tehsils of Punjab, Pakistan